Life Sciences is a weekly peer-reviewed scientific journal covering research on the molecular, cellular, and physiological mechanisms of pharmacotherapy. It was started in 1962 by Pergamon Press.

According to the Journal Citation Reports, Life Sciences has a 2021 impact factor of 6.780.

The current Editor in Chief is Loren E. Wold.

References

External links 
 

Pharmacology journals
Elsevier academic journals
Weekly journals
Publications established in 1962
English-language journals